The 2015 Southwestern Athletic Conference baseball tournament was held at Wesley Barrow Stadium in New Orleans, Louisiana, from May 13 through 17.   won their third conference title, and first since 2008, to earn the conference's automatic bid to the 2015 NCAA Division I baseball tournament.

The double elimination tournament featured four teams from each division. Mississippi Valley State, from the East Division was ineligible for the postseason due to Academic Progress Rate penalties. Southern, from the West Division, was originally ineligible for postseason play in all sports, including baseball, due to failing to supply usable data to the NCAA.

Seeding and format
The four eligible teams in each division will be seeded one through four, with the top seed from each division facing the fourth seed from the opposite division in the first round, and so on.  The teams then play a two bracket, double-elimination tournament with a one-game final between the winners of each bracket.

Bracket

References

2015 Southwestern Athletic Conference baseball season
Tournament
Southwestern Athletic Conference baseball tournament
Southwestern Athletic Conference baseball tournament